Zlatina Nedeva (1878–1941) was a Bulgarian actress and director.

She was born 26 November 1878 in Tryavna. Her sisters Nevena Teneva and Marta Popova were drama artists. She graduated from the Veliko Tarnovo girl high-school in 1894.

Zlatina Nedeva relocated to Zagreb and graduated as a drama artist. She made her first debut in the Croatian National Theatre in Zagreb in the role of Elisaveta in Mary Stuart of Friedrich Schiler. In 1903 she became and actress in the "Salza i Smyah" troupe in Sofia.

During the periods of 1904–1920, 1926–1930, 1932-1934 and 1936–1941, she was acting in the Ivan Vazov National Theatre in Sofia, Bulgaria.

Between 1921 and 1924 She also worked in the traveling theater "Kameren Theater" that she founded. In 1934 and 1935 she was a director and producer in the Pleven and Burgas Theaters.

Major roles 
 Anisiya - "The Power of Darkness" by Leo Tolstoy
 Masha - "Three Sisters" by Anton Chehov
 Vasilisa - "The lower depths" by Maxim Gorky
 Zoya - "Borislav" by Ivan Vazov
 Maria - "Ivaylo" by Ivan Vazov
 Vida - "Boryana" by Yordan Yovkov
 G-zha Maslarska - "Milionerat" by Yordan Yovkov

References 

1878 births
1941 deaths
Bulgarian stage actresses
20th-century Bulgarian actresses
Bulgarian theatre directors
Women theatre directors
People from Tryavna